Gerd Hagman (4 July 1919 – 30 November 2011) was a Swedish actress. She appeared in more than 20 films and television shows between 1940 and 2007.

Selected filmography
 Blossom Time (1940)
 The Fight Continues (1941)
Home from Babylon (1941)
 Nothing Is Forgotten (1942)
 Ride Tonight! (1942)
 There's a Fire Burning (1943)
 Mother Takes a Vacation (1957)
 Hello Baby (1976)
 Crime in Paradise (1959)

References

External links

1919 births
2011 deaths
20th-century Swedish actresses
21st-century Swedish actresses
Swedish film actresses
Swedish television actresses
Actresses from Stockholm